Höxter is  a town in eastern North Rhine-Westphalia, Germany on the left bank of the river Weser, 52 km north of Kassel in the centre of the Weser Uplands. The main town's population is around 15,000, and with outlying centres, about 30,000. It is the seat of the Höxter district. Historical place names of Höxter are Hoxer and Huxaria.

Geography

Subdivisions 
As part of North Rhine-Westphalia's municipal reforms, the collective municipality of Höxter came into being on 1 January 1970, formed out of the eleven communities of the former Amt of Höxter-Land, the main town, and the community of Bruchhausen from the former Amt of Beverungen. The communities in question voluntarily merged to pool their resources and bring about a unified administration. These constituent communities are:

Albaxen
Bosseborn
Bödexen
Brenkhausen
Bruchhausen
Fürstenau
Godelheim
Lüchtringen
Lütmarsen
Ottbergen
Ovenhausen
Stahle

History 
Höxter (Latin Huxaria) in the time of Charlemagne was a villa regia, and was the scene of a battle between his forces and the Saxons. Under the protection of the Abbey of Corvey it gradually increased in prosperity, and became the chief town of the principality of Corvey. Later it asserted its independence and joined the Hanseatic League.

Höxter was located on the important long distance trade-route known as Hellweg. Rivalry with Corvey Abbey and the nearby town known as Corvey increased and in 1265, the burghers of Höxter allied themselves with the Bishop of Paderborn. Their troops destroyed the town of Corvey and damaged the abbey. The town never recovered and over the following decades reverted to a small village. This event also marked the beginning of the long period of decline of the abbey.

Höxter suffered severely during the Thirty Years' War. In 1634, Imperial troops laid siege to the town in what became known as the Blutbad von Höxter (massacre of Höxter).

After the Peace of Westphalia in 1648 it was united with Brunswick; in 1802 it passed to Nassau and in 1807 to the Kingdom of Westphalia, after the dismemberment of which, in 1814, it came into the possession of Prussia.

In 2005, an explosion within a house in the historic town centre damaged the town hall and many other significant buildings and resulted in three deaths. Work has started on the rebuilding of the damaged area but is expected to continue for many years.

Albaxen 
Albaxen had its first documentary mention, under the name Albachtessen, on the occasion of the neighbouring Corvey Abbey's founding in 822, and by 900 it was already known by its current name. The Albaxen parish church was likewise first mentioned in the 9th century. The Tonenburg, a mediaeval building complex near Albaxen – not truly a castle as the name suggests – was built in 1350 by Corvey Abbey.

Lüchtringen 
In 854, Lüchtringen was first mentioned under the name Lutringi (12 different spellings, including Luhtringi and Luchtringi) in Corvey Abbey's annals and beginning in 1230 it belonged to the fourth archdeaconate of Höxter-Corvey of the Bishopric of Paderborn. Before it became Prussian in 1813, Lüchtringen belonged to the Principality of Orange-Nassau in Fulda from 1803. In 1970, Lüchtringen lost its independence and became a constituent community of Höxter.

Lüchtringen is North Rhine-Westphalia's easternmost community.

Economy 
The town's main manufactured products are linen, cotton, cement and gutta-percha latex, and there is also a considerable shipping trade.

Höxter also has long been an important garrison town and the presence of the military continues to play a large role in the local economy.

Arts and culture

Events 
Regular culinary events in Höxter are "Höxter Kulinarisch" and the "Fischer- und Flößertage" ("Fishermen's and Raftsmen's Days"). At these events, gastronomy and the advertising community get together and present culinary delights.

Attractions 

Höxter has a medieval town hall and historic houses with high gables and carved façades from the 15th and 16th centuries. Many of the buildings in this area were damaged or destroyed by the great explosion in 2005. The most notable of the churches is the Protestant church of Saint Kilian, with a pulpit dating from 1595 and a font dating from 1631. The Weser is crossed here by a stone bridge about 150 m in length, erected in 1833.

On the Brunsberg abutting the town is an old watchtower, said to be the remains of a fortress built by Widukind's brother Bruno.

Attractions in Höxter include:
The extensively preserved mediaeval town structure is made up of half-timbered buildings, among which are found a few examples of the Weser Renaissance style. Notable among these are the Adam-und-Eva-Haus on Stummrige Straße and the old Dechanei (Deacon's House) on the marketplace, featuring over 60 carved rosettes, none of them identical.
On Höxter's outskirts lies Schloss Corvey, formerly Corvey Abbey, on the bank of the Weser. The abbey church has a Carolingian crypt as well as an imposing westwork. Furthermore, the poet Hoffmann von Fallersleben, who wrote Das Lied der Deutschen, worked here as a librarian and is buried next to the church.
As part of the Erlebniswelt Renaissance ("Renaissance Adventure World"), there is a town walk with the theme "market", on which visitors may solve a murder case from 1617.
The Obermühle Höxter ("Höxter Upper Mill") is a former watermill that once belonged to Corvey Abbey. Today it houses the Mühlencafé.
 The Tonenburg (see History above)

Sports 
There are many sport clubs in Höxter. The biggest club is the Höxter Handball and Athletics Club (HLC Höxter), which furthermore offers fitness courses, swimming, aquajogging, back gymnastics, badminton and judo. There is also the Höxter-Weserbergland Football Arena. There, on two indoor courts on artificial turf, the year round, the newest generation of football can be played.

Government

Town council 

The town council's 44 seats are apportioned as follows, in accordance with municipal elections held on 30 August 2009:
CDU 17 seats
SPD 14 seats
Greens 3 seats
FDP 4 seats
DIE LINKE 1 seat
UWG 5 seats
Note: UWG is a citizens' coalition.

Mayor 
The mayor is Daniel Hartmann, independent candidate (since 2020).

Coat of arms 
Höxter's oldest known seals date from the 13th century, the same century during which the town was granted town rights. The current arms, showing an ecclesiastical structure, have been used since the 19th century, and are modelled after the second seal, known from 1285. The arms were granted once again in 1970.

Twin towns – sister cities

Höxter is twinned with:
 Corbie, France (1963/1964)
 Sudbury, England, United Kingdom (1979/1980)

Infrastructure 
Höxter is served by four railway stations: Höxter Rathaus, Höxter-Ottbergen, Höxter-Lüchtringen and Höxter-Godelheim, all on the Altenbeken–Kreiensen line. The line is run by NordWestBahn who run the Egge-Bahn towards Paderborn and Holzminden. The Sollingbahn also terminates at Ottbergen, and links to Northeim in Lower Saxony.

All public transport in Höxter can be used on the integrated fare system within the Paderborn-Höxter Local Transport Association (Nahverkehrsverbund Paderborn-Höxter).

Education 
Höxter is one of the four locations of the Ostwestfalen-Lippe University of Applied Sciences (German:Technische Hochschule Ostwestfalen-Lippe).
Secondary education in Höxter includes the König-Wilhelm-Gymnasium, the Hoffmann-von-Fallersleben-Realschule and the Hauptschule as well as a sales school (kaufmännische Schule, a vocational and economics Gymnasium).

Notable people
 (1864–1959), Lord mayor of Gelsenkirchen in 1919–1928
Jacob Pins (1917–2005), Israeli artist
Klaus Töpfer (born 1938), politician (CDU) and federal minister, came to Höxter as a child
Hans Christoph Becker-Foss (born 1949), conductor and organist
Anja Niedringhaus (1965–2014), reporter
Thomas von Heesen (born 1961), football player and manager
Koray Günter (born 1994), footballer

References 
Much of this article is based on a translation of an article from the German Wikipedia.

External links 

  

Höxter (district)
Members of the Hanseatic League